The 4.2-kiloyear (thousand years) BP aridification event (long-term drought) was one of the most severe climatic events of the Holocene epoch. It defines the beginning of the current Meghalayan age in the Holocene epoch. 

Starting around 2200 BC, it probably lasted the entire 22nd century BC. It has been hypothesised to have caused the collapse of the Old Kingdom in Egypt as well as the Akkadian Empire in Mesopotamia, and the Liangzhu culture in the lower Yangtze River area. The drought may also have initiated the collapse of the Indus Valley Civilisation, with some of its population moving southeastward to follow the movement of their desired habitat, as well as the migration of Indo-European-speaking people into India.

Some scientists disagree with that conclusion, citing evidence that the event was not a global drought and did not happen in a clear timeline.

Evidence
 A phase of intense aridity about 4.2 ka BP is recorded across North Africa, the Middle East, the Red Sea, the Arabian Peninsula, the Indian subcontinent, and midcontinental North America. Glaciers throughout the mountain ranges of western Canada advanced about that time. Evidence has also been found in an Italian cave flowstone, the Kilimanjaro ice sheet, and in Andean glacier ice. The onset of the aridification in Mesopotamia in about 4100 BP also coincided with a cooling event in the North Atlantic, known as Bond event 3. Despite the geographic diversity of these examples, evidence for the 4.2 kyr event in Northern Europe is ambiguous, which suggests that the origins and effects of the event are spatially complex.

In 2018, the International Commission on Stratigraphy divided the Holocene epoch into three periods, with the late Holocene from approximately 2250 BC onwards designated as the Meghalayan stage/age. The boundary stratotype is a speleothem in Mawmluh cave in India, and the global auxiliary stratotype is an ice core from Mount Logan in Canada. However, justification for this division is debated as the event was not a global drought and did not happen within a clear timeframe. Jessica Tierney, a paleoclimatologist at the University of Arizona in Tucson, states that proponents of the new partitioning mistakenly "lumped together evidence of other droughts and wet periods, sometimes centuries away from the event."

Effects

Ireland
In Ireland, there is little definitive record of the 4.2-kiloyear event outside of a brief isotopic excursion in some cave speleothem records. The manner in which this climatic event manifested itself in the region is thus unclear.

Iberian Peninsula
On the Iberian Peninsula, the construction of motillas-type settlements in the period after 2200 BC is believed to be the consequence of the severe aridification that affected this area.

According to Mejías et al., who reported the first palaeohydrogeological interdisciplinary research in La Mancha, Spain,

The authors' analysis verified a relationship between the geological substrate and the spatial distribution of the motillas.

Ancient Egypt
In c. 2150 BC, Egypt was hit by a series of exceptionally low Nile floods that may have influenced the collapse of the centralised government of the Old Kingdom after a famine.

Arabian Peninsula
In the Persian Gulf region, there was a sudden change in settlement pattern, style of pottery and tombs. The 22nd century BC drought marks the end of the Umm Al Nar culture and the change to the Wadi Suq culture.

Mesopotamia
The aridification of Mesopotamia may have been related to the onset of cooler sea-surface temperatures in the North Atlantic (Bond event 3), as analysis of the modern instrumental record shows that large (50%) interannual reductions in Mesopotamian water supply result when subpolar northwest Atlantic sea surface temperatures are anomalously cool. The headwaters of the Tigris and Euphrates rivers are fed by elevation-induced capture of winter Mediterranean rainfall.

The Akkadian Empire in 2300 BC was the second civilisation to subsume independent societies into a single state (the first being ancient Egypt in around 3100 BC). It has been claimed that the collapse of the state was influenced by a wide-ranging, centuries-long drought. Archaeological evidence documents widespread abandonment of the agricultural plains of northern Mesopotamia and dramatic influxes of refugees into southern Mesopotamia, around 2170 BC. A 180-km-long wall, the "Repeller of the Amorites", was built across central Mesopotamia to stem nomadic incursions to the south. Around 2150 BC, the Gutian people, who originally inhabited the Zagros Mountains, defeated the demoralised Akkadian army, took Akkad and destroyed it around 2115 BC. Widespread agricultural change in the Near East is visible at the end of the 3rd millennium BC.

Resettlement of the northern plains by smaller sedentary populations occurred near 1900 BC, three centuries after the collapse.

A study of fossil corals in Oman provides evidence that prolonged winter shamal seasons, around 4200 years ago, led to the salinization of the irrigated field, which made a dramatic decrease in crop production trigger a widespread famine and eventually the collapse of the ancient Akkadian Empire.

South and Central Asia

In the 2nd millennium BC, widespread aridification occurred in the Eurasian steppes and in South Asia. On the steppes, the vegetation changed, driving "higher mobility and transition to the nomadic cattle breeding." Water shortage also strongly affected South Asia: 

Urban centers of the Indus Valley civilisation were abandoned and replaced by disparate local cultures because of the same climate change that affected the neighbouring regions to the west. , many scholars believed that drought and a decline in trade with Egypt and Mesopotamia caused the collapse of the Indus civilisation. The Ghaggar-Hakra system was rain-fed, and water supply depended on the monsoons. The Indus Valley climate grew significantly cooler and drier from about 1800 BC, which is linked to a contemporary general weakening of the monsoon. Aridity increased, with the Ghaggar-Hakra River retracting its reach towards the foothills of the Himalayas, leading to erratic and less-extensive floods, which made inundation agriculture less sustainable. Aridification reduced the water supply enough to cause the civilisation's demise, and to scatter its population eastward.

Ancient China
The drought may have caused the collapse of Neolithic cultures around Central China in the late 3rd millennium BC. At the same time, the middle reaches of the Yellow River saw a series of extraordinary floods related to the legendary figure of Yu the Great. In the Yishu River Basin (a river basin that consists of the Yi River (沂河) of Shandong and Shu River), the flourishing Longshan culture was affected by a cooling that severely reduced rice output and led to a substantial decrease in population and to fewer archaeological sites. In about 2000 BC, Longshan was displaced by the Yueshi culture, which had fewer and less-sophisticated artifacts of ceramic and bronze.

See also

2300–2200 BCE Great Flood (China)
2354–2345 BCE climate anomaly
8.2-kiloyear event
African humid period
Bond event
Climate variability and change
Late Bronze Age collapse § Environmental (c. 1200-1150 BC)
Timeline of environmental history

Notes

References

Further reading

External links
 The Egyptian Old Kingdom, Sumer and Akkad
 The End of the Old Kingdom
Michael Marshall (26 January 2022), 'Did a mega drought topple empires 4,200 years ago?', Nature

Droughts
22nd century BC
22nd century BC in Egypt
Ancient Near East
Old Kingdom of Egypt
First Intermediate Period of Egypt
Akkadian Empire
Pepi II Neferkare